|}

The Rossington Main Novices' Hurdle is a Grade 2 National Hunt hurdle race in Great Britain which is open to horses aged four years or older. It is run at Haydock Park over a distance of about 1 mile 7½ furlongs (1 mile 7 furlongs 144 yards, or 3,149 metres), and during its running there are nine hurdles to be jumped. The race is for novice hurdlers, and it is scheduled to take place each year in January.

The race was first run at Doncaster in 1948 and continued there until 1997.  The following year it was moved to Wetherby.  It was transferred to its present home, Haydock Park, in 2005. The 2012 running was sponsored by William Hill and run as the Williamhill.com "Supreme Trial" Novices' Hurdle and since 2014 it has been sponsored by Sky Bet.

Winners

See also
 Horse racing in Great Britain
 List of British National Hunt races

References
 Racing Post:
 
 pedigreequery.com – Rossington Main Novices' Hurdle.
 
 British Newspaper Archive

National Hunt races in Great Britain
Haydock Park Racecourse
National Hunt hurdle races
Recurring sporting events established in 1971
1971 establishments in England